The Columbia River drainage basin is the drainage basin of the Columbia River in the Pacific Northwest region of North America. In common usage, the term often refers to a smaller area, generally the portion of the drainage basin that lies within eastern Washington.

Usage of the term "Columbia Basin" in British Columbia generally refers only to the immediate basins of the Columbia and Kootenay Rivers and excludes that of the Okanagan, Kettle and Similkameen Rivers.

Description 
The Columbia Basin includes the southeastern portion of the Canadian province of British Columbia, most of the U.S. states of Idaho, Oregon, and Washington, the western part of Montana, and very small portions of Nevada, Utah, and Wyoming. The south and southeastern drainage divide borders the interior drainage of the northern Great Basin. To the northeast the region borders the basins of the Saskatchewan River (Hudson Bay) and the MacKenzie River (Beaufort Sea), and to the northwest the basin of the Fraser River.  The Columbia Basin extends from the Rocky Mountains in the east through the Cascade Range to the Columbia River's outflow at the Pacific Ocean in the west.

The Columbia River pours more water into the Pacific Ocean than any other river in North or South America. In its  course to the Pacific Ocean, the Columbia flows through four mountain ranges—the Rockies, Selkirks, Cascades, and coastal mountains—and drains . The mainstem of the Columbia rises in Columbia Lake on the west slope of the Rocky Mountain Range in Canada. Its largest tributary, the Snake, travels  from its source in Yellowstone National Park in Wyoming before joining the Columbia. When Lewis and Clark explored the region in the early 19th century, huge numbers of fish (salmon) returned to spawn every year. "The multitudes of this fish are almost inconceivable," Clark wrote in the autumn of 1805. At that time, the Columbia and its tributaries provided  of pristine river habitat.

Common usage 
Residents of the area surrounding the confluence of the Columbia and Snake rivers—a region centering on the Tri-Cities, Washington metropolitan area—use the term "Columbia Basin" to refer to their own, much smaller region. This usage is roughly synonymous with the Columbia Plateau or roughly equivalent to the relatively unforested area bounded by the Cascades, Blue, Wallowa, and Rocky mountain ranges and the Okanagan Highland. This sense of the term Columbia Basin has expanded from its early focus on the land irrigated by Grand Coulee Dam and the Columbia Basin Project to include other irrigation districts such as the Yakima and Walla Walla valleys. The area includes valuable farmland that has excellent soil profile and underlying silty loess. At its center is the Pasco Basin, an area roughly double the size of, and fully containing, the Hanford Site.

See also
Inland Northwest
Columbia Basin Project

References

External links
Geology of Washington - Columbia Basin, Washington State Department of Natural Resources

 http://www.basininstitute.org/home/index.html

Columbia River
Interior of British Columbia
Watersheds of the United States
Landforms of Idaho
Landforms of Montana
Basins of Nevada
Landforms of Wyoming
Landforms of Utah
Regions of the United States